Newquay railway station serves the town and seaside resort of Newquay in Cornwall, England. The station is situated in the heart of Newquay, close to the town centre itself and the beaches. The station is managed by Great Western Railway which operates local branch line services to and from Par. In the summer, there are also services to and from London.

History
The first railway at Newquay was a horse-worked line from the harbour to Hendra Crazey. It was built by Joseph Treffry in stages between 1846 and 1849. The line was extended on 1 June 1874 by the Cornwall Minerals Railway, goods trains now reaching Fowey. A branch line from Tolcarn Junction, just outside Newquay, ran to Gravel Hill Mine near Treamble where there was an iron mine.

Passenger trains were introduced on 20 June 1876.  The Great Western Railway operated all the trains from 1 October 1877 and bought out the Cornwall Minerals Railway on 1 July 1896.

The original station had just a single platform and a turntable at the end of the platform was used to release locomotives from incoming trains. The station was rebuilt in 1905 with two platforms serving three tracks. A new line was opened from Shepherds, on the Treamble branch, to Perranporth on 2 January 1905, which allowed a new service to run from Newquay to Truro. The following year through carriages started to be run from London using the direct line from Par.

The main departure platform was lengthened in 1928 and again in 1935; the second platform was lengthened in 1938. These enlargements were to accommodate the longer trains that were now bringing holidaymakers from London and elsewhere. Extensive carriage sidings were laid on the south side of the station to store these trains between services.

The station started to be run down following the closure of the line to Truro on 4 February 1963.  The goods yard was closed in 1965; the roof on platforms 2 and 3 was removed in 1964. Platform 3 was shortened in 1966 and its locomotive release line taken out of use on 4 October 1972, by which time four of the carriage sidings had been removed. On 5 October 1987 the signal box was closed, all the remaining signals were dismantled and the rails serving platform 1 were lifted. At the same time the last of the carriage sidings were closed and lifted. The track beside the former platform 3 was kept as a siding until the mid-1990s.

The remaining platform has been resurfaced for its entire length in early 2012, and the former station canopies have been replaced by a new  by  wave-shaped canopy above the concourse.

Until 2020, Newquay was served by CrossCountry services from the North of England on summer weekends.

Newquay Harbour

The original terminus of the Newquay Railway was at the harbour. Horses hauled wagons along a line that wound between houses to reach the top of a 1 in 4½ incline that carried the line down to the harbour. Wagons were lowered on a cable down the incline, which was in a tunnel dug out of the cliff. At the foot the track ran onto the eastern breakwater but a shunt-back and wooden trestle bridge gave access to the stone jetty in the middle of the harbour.

After steam locomotives were introduced by the Cornwall Minerals Railway in 1874, wagons continued to be moved between Newquay railway station and the harbour incline by horses. Traffic handled at the harbour gradually declined and the line was closed in 1925 and lifted in 1926. Part of the route is now a footpath from opposite the station to the cliff tops above the beach.

Trenance Viaduct

Between Newquay station and Tolcarn Junction the line crosses the Trenance valley on a 154-yard (141m) viaduct. The first structure, opened on 29 January 1849, was a timber structure on stone piers. It was much lighter than the similarly-constructed Cornwall Railway viaducts that were built a few years later, and very different from the imposing granite Treffry Viaduct built by Treffry for his Par tramway.

The piers were raised and new wrought iron girders installed ready for the opening of the line for locomotives in 1874. This was replaced by the present masonry structure on 27 March 1939. It carried two tracks from 20 March 1946; the line to Tolcarn Junction was singled on 23 November 1964 but the second line was retained for shunting purposes until the rationalisation in the 1980s.

Facilities
The station has a staffed ticket office which is open from mid May until early September, however it does not have a ticket vending machine so when the ticket office is closed (outside of summer), passengers have to purchase their tickets on-board the train. Seating is available under the station canopy and on the platform, also in the platform shelter. Refreshments are available on the station concourse.

Government funding was announced in January 2023 to reinstate the second platform at Newquay and make other improvements to Newquay station, such as a larger concourse, ticket machines, platform canopies and a bus interchange.

Services
The service is irregular with typically one train around every two hours.

As well as the local service, the station handles a number of long-distance trains in the summer. This service includes Great Western Railway trains from London Paddington which do not stop at intermediate stations between Par and Newquay. On Sundays, there are some local trains and a small number of intercity services. As well as the weekend through trains, in summer months there is also a Monday-Friday through Great Western Railway intercity service to and from London, but local trains continue on these days too. Traditionally, there was no Sunday service in the winter, but the line has a service of three trains each way on Sundays from 11 December 2011.

Community rail
The local trains between Par and Newquay are designated as a community rail service, supported by marketing from the Devon and Cornwall Rail Partnership. The route is promoted as the "Atlantic Coast Line". Three pubs in Newquay take part in the Atlantic Coast Line rail ale trail.

References

External links

Newquay
Railway stations in Cornwall
Former Great Western Railway stations
Railway stations in Great Britain opened in 1876
Railway stations served by Great Western Railway
DfT Category F1 stations